National Secondary Route 111, or just Route 111 (or ) is a National Road Route of Costa Rica, located in the Alajuela, Heredia provinces.

Description
In Alajuela province the route covers Alajuela canton (Río Segundo district).

In Heredia province the route covers Heredia canton (Mercedes, San Francisco, Ulloa districts), Belén canton (San Antonio, La Ribera, La Asunción districts).

References

Highways in Costa Rica